The 1971 Denver Broncos season was the team's 12th season in professional football and second in the National Football League (NFL). Led by fifth-year head coach and general manager Lou Saban, the Broncos finished the season with four wins, nine losses, and one tie, again fourth in the AFC West. Fifth-year running back Floyd Little became the thirteenth in professional football history to rush for over 1,000 yards in a season; the future hall of famer ran for 1,133 yards, averaging four yards per carry.

On Wednesday, November 17, Saban stepped down as head coach, but remained as general manager; offensive line coach Jerry Smith led the team for the final five games, with two wins. Several days after the season finale, Saban was rehired as head coach of the Buffalo Bills, who had just one victory in 1971. they improved to 9–5 in 1973 and made the playoffs in 1974.

In early January 1972, the Broncos hired John Ralston as head coach and general manager; he was previously the head coach for nine years at Stanford University, upset winners of the last two Rose Bowls.

Offseason

NFL draft

Personnel

Staff

Roster

Regular season

Schedule

Standings

References

External links 
 Denver Broncos – 1971 media guide
 1971 Denver Broncos at Pro-Football-Reference.com

Denver Broncos seasons
Denver Broncos
1971 in sports in Colorado